The Agrarian University of Havana "Fructuoso Rodríguez Pérez" (Spanish: Universidad Agraria de La Habana "Fructuoso Rodríguez Pérez", UNAH) is a university located in San José de las Lajas, Mayabeque Province, Cuba.

Organization
The university is divided into seven faculties:

 Faculty of Agriculture
 Faculty of Social Sciences and Humanities
 Faculty of Economics
 Faculty of Physical Education
 Faculty of Agricultural Engineering
 Faculty of Veterinary Medicine
 Faculty of Informatic Sciences
 Faculty of Pedagogical Science

See also 

Education in Cuba
 Havana
List of universities in Cuba

External links
 Agrarian University of Havana Website 

Universities in Cuba
Education in Havana
San José de las Lajas
Buildings and structures in Mayabeque Province